Without Trumpet or Drum (French: Sans tambour ni trompette) is a 1950 French comedy film directed by Roger Blanc and starring André Gabriello, Gaby Morlay and Jules Berry.

Cast
 André Gabriello as André Berbezieux de Saint-Rozay
 Jules Berry as Le cousin
 Jean Parédès as Le fou
 Gaby Morlay
 Madeleine Rousset
 Daniel Clérice
 Anouk Ferjac 	
 Jean Vinci 		
 Roger Rafal 
 Jean Témerson	
 Robert Le Fort		
 Nicky Charriére	
 Roland Armontel 	
 Simone Delamare 		
 Catherine Fath	
 Jacqueline Noëlle

References

Bibliography 
 Goble, Alan. The Complete Index to Literary Sources in Film. Walter de Gruyter, 1999.

External links 
 

1950 films
French comedy films
1950 comedy films
1950s French-language films
Films directed by Roger Blanc
French black-and-white films
1950s French films